Massimo Dobrovic is an Istrian Italian actor known from the show Euros of Hollywood.  He is openly gay.

Filmography

Film

Television

Live TV

References

External links 

Italian male film actors
Italian male television actors
Italian gay actors
Living people
1984 births
Istrian Italian people